Sammarinese National Olympic Committee is the National Olympic Committee representing San Marino.

See also
San Marino at the Olympics

External links
 

San Marino
San Marino at the Olympics
1959 establishments in San Marino
Olym
Sports organizations established in 1959